Sami, also referred to as Samia, Arini, or Makistos was a city in Ancient Greece. It was located in the Elis region, in western Peloponnese. The archaeological site consists of the remains  of Sami's fortified citadel, which dates to the Archaic period. It is situated on the slopes of the Lapithas mountain and faces the coast of the Ionian sea and also the plain of the Kato Samiko area.

Nearest places
Ancient Olympia
Zacharo

Cities in ancient Peloponnese
Ancient Elis